The Nordheide (literally: "North Heath") is the northernmost part of the Lüneburg Heath in Germany. It runs from the Harburg Hills to the municipality of Handeloh. South of that lies the Lüneburg Heath Nature Park and the Südheide with the Südheide Nature Park.

External links 
 Nordheide Region website

Lüneburg Heath